was a field marshal (gensui) in the Imperial Japanese Army during World War II. He was the last surviving Japanese military officer with a marshal's rank. Hata was convicted of war crimes and sentenced to life imprisonment in 1948, but was paroled in 1954.

Biography

Early years 

Hata was a native of Fukushima Prefecture, where his father was a samurai of the Aizu Domain. At the age of 12, the family relocated to Hakodate, Hokkaidō, but at the age of 14, he was accepted into the prestigious First Tokyo Middle School. However, his father died the same year. Unable to afford the tuition, Hata enrolled in the Army Cadet School instead, going on to graduate in the 12th class of the Imperial Japanese Army Academy in 1901 as a second lieutenant in the artillery. Hata served in the Russo-Japanese War. He graduated from the 22nd class of the Army Staff College with top rankings in November 1910.

Sent as a military attaché to Germany in March 1912, Hata stayed in Europe throughout World War I as a military observer. He was promoted to major in September 1914 and to lieutenant colonel in July 1918, while still in Europe, and he stayed on as a member of the Japanese delegation to the Versailles Peace Treaty negotiations in February 1919.

On his return to Japan, Hata was promoted to colonel and given command of the 16th Field Artillery Regiment in July 1921, and was promoted to major general and commander of the 4th Heavy Field Artillery Brigade in March 1926.

Hata was subsequently assigned to the strategic planning division of the Imperial Japanese Army General Staff, serving as chief of the Fourth Bureau in July 1927 and Chief of the First Bureau in August 1928.

Hata was promoted to lieutenant general in August 1931 and became Inspector General of Artillery Training. He was then given a field command, that of the 14th Division in August 1933. After serving as head of the Imperial Japanese Army Air Service from December 1935, he became commander of the Taiwan Army of Japan in 1936.

Second Sino-Japanese War and World War II

His rise after the start of the Second Sino-Japanese War was then very rapid: Military Councilor, Inspector General of Military Training and promotion rank of general all in late 1937. He was appointed as commanding general of the Central China Expeditionary Army in February 1938, to replace General Matsui Iwane, who had been recalled to Japan over the Nanjing Massacre. Hata became Senior Aide-de-Camp to Emperor Shōwa in May 1939 followed by a stint as Minister of War from August 1939 to July 1940 during the terms of Prime Minister Nobuyuki Abe and Mitsumasa Yonai. In July 1940, Hata had a pivotal role in bringing down the Yonai cabinet by resigning his post as Minister of War.

Hata returned to China as commander-in-chief of the China Expeditionary Army in March 1941. He was the main Japanese commander at the time of Zhejiang-Jiangxi Campaign, during which Chinese sources claim that over 250,000 civilians were killed. Hata was promoted to the rank of Field Marshal (Gensui) on June 2, 1944 following Japanese victory at Operation Ichi-Go.

Hata was requested to take command of the Second General Army, based in Hiroshima from 1944 to 1945 in preparation for the anticipated Allied invasion of the Japanese home islands. He was thus in Hiroshima at the time of the atomic bombing and survived. One of the only senior figures to survive the explosion, Hata took command of the city and relief efforts in the following days. Hata was one of the senior generals who agreed with the decision to surrender, but asked that he be stripped of his title of Field Marshal in atonement for the Army's failures in the war.

Promotions 
 Second Lieutenant: June 1901
 Lieutenant: November 1903
 Captain: June 1905
 Major: April 1914
 Lieutenant Colonel: July 1918
 Colonel: July 20, 1921
 Major General: March 2, 1926
 Lieutenant General: August 1, 1931
 General: November 1, 1937
 Marshal: June 2, 1944

Judgement 

Hata was arrested by the American occupation authorities after the end of the war, and charged with war crimes. He was the only surviving Japanese Field Marshal who faced criminal charges along with other defendants. In 1948, as a result of the International Military Tribunal for the Far East, he was sentenced to life imprisonment under the charges of: “Conspiracy, waging aggressive war, disregarding his duty to prevent atrocities”. Hata was paroled in 1954, and headed a charitable foundation for the welfare of former soldiers from 1958. He died in 1962, while attending a ceremony honouring the war dead.

Hata's older brother, Eitaro Hata (1872–1930), was also a general in the Imperial Japanese Army, and commander-in-chief of the Kwangtung Army, from July 1929 until his death, in May 1930, from acute nephritis.

References

Books

External links

Notes 

 
|-

1879 births
1962 deaths
Military personnel from Fukushima Prefecture
Marshals of Japan
Hibakusha
Japanese people convicted of war crimes
Japanese military personnel of the Russo-Japanese War
Japanese military personnel of World War II
Ministers of the Imperial Japanese Army
Japanese people convicted of the international crime of aggression
Japanese people convicted of crimes against humanity
People convicted by the International Military Tribunal for the Far East
Japanese prisoners sentenced to life imprisonment
Prisoners sentenced to life imprisonment by international courts and tribunals
Japanese politicians convicted of crimes
Imperial Japanese Army officers